The Women's points race was held on 15 October 2015. 18 riders participated over a distance of 25 km (100 laps), with sprints every 10 laps awarding 5, 3, 2 or 1 point to the first four; 20 points are also awarded/withdrawn for each lap gained/lost respectively.

Results

References

Women's points race
European Track Championships – Women's points race